Bartlett City Schools is a municipal school district serving Bartlett, Tennessee, United States.

Location
In February 2014, the school district moved its headquarters from Bartlett City Hall into the former special education offices at Bartlett High School. In December 2018 they moved into their current location at 5705 Stage Road.

History
Following the merger of Memphis City Schools and Shelby County Schools in 2013, a referendum was put forth to the residents of Bartlett to form their own school district.  In July 2013, the residents of Bartlett approved the referendum and Bartlett City Schools was created. On December 20, 2013, the Bartlett City Schools board voted unanimously to appoint former Shelby County Schools Deputy Superintendent, David Stephens, as Superintendent. On August 4, 2014, Bartlett City Schools officially opened for their first day of classes.

Schools
Bartlett City Schools serves the following schools:

Elementary
 Altruria Elementary School
 Bartlett Elementary School
 Bon Lin Elementary School
 Ellendale Elementary School
 Oak Elementary School
 Rivercrest Elementary School

Middle
 Appling Middle School
 Bon Lin Middle School
 Elmore Park Middle School

High
 Bartlett Ninth Grade Academy
 Bartlett High School

Other
In February 2014, the district approved an open enrollment policy for students who do not live in the City of Bartlett.

References

External links
Bartlett City Schools
 "Schools in Transition." The Commercial Appeal.

Bartlett, Tennessee
School districts in Shelby County, Tennessee
School districts established in 2013